Kristen K. Flaa (3 October 1925 – 10 January 2021) was a Norwegian politician for the Centre Party.

Career
He was a farmer and chaired Aust-Agder Agrarian Association from 1955 to 1960. He served as mayor of Birkenes from 1972 to 1991 and county mayor of Aust-Agder from 1972 to 1975.

Flaa also chaired the boards of Fædrelandsvennen and Sørlandsbanken, and was a board member of Norske Melkeprodusenters Landsforbund from 1971 to 1982. The King's Medal of Merit in Gold was bestowed upon Flaa in 1992.

References

1925 births
2021 deaths
People from Birkenes
Chairmen of County Councils of Norway
Centre Party (Norway) politicians
Mayors of places in Aust-Agder